Wichert may refer to:

People
 Christian Wichert (born 1987), German ice hockey player
 Ernst Wichert (1831–1902), German lawyer, judge, and author
 Ewald Wichert (born 1940), German boxer
 Fritz Wichert (1878-1951), German art historian
 Lars Wichert (born 1986), German rower
 Sabine Wichert (1942-2014), Northern Irish poet

Places
 Wichert, Illinois, United States

See also
 Wychert